Sugarsmack were an American alternative rock band based in Charlotte, North Carolina, United States, formed by Hope Nicholls and Aaron Pitkin. The group was put together after Hope had departed from her previous band, Fetchin Bones, and had begun to write new music with Pitkin. They began to collaborate with guitarist Chris Chandek, who was eventually asked to join permanently along with his friend John Adamian and Deanna Gonzalez. They were popular locally, with their eclectic sound earning them comparisons to The Fall. The band debuted with Top Loader in 1993 and released their only major label album in 1998 with Tank Top City.

Discography
Studio albums
Top Loader (1993, Invisible)
Tank Top City (1998, Sire)

EPs
Zsa Zsa (1992, Three AM)
Spanish Riffs (1995, Yesha)

References

External links 
 
 

Alternative rock groups from North Carolina
Music of North Carolina
Musical groups established in 1992
Musical groups disestablished in 1998
Rock music groups from North Carolina
Sire Records artists